The canton of La Région Limouxine (before 2015: canton of Limoux) is an administrative division of the Aude department, southern France. Its borders were modified at the French canton reorganisation which came into effect in March 2015. Its seat is in Limoux.

It consists of the following communes:
 
Ajac
Alet-les-Bains
Belcastel-et-Buc
La Bezole
Bouriège
Bourigeole
Castelreng
Caunette-sur-Lauquet
Cépie
Clermont-sur-Lauquet
Cournanel
La Digne-d'Amont
La Digne-d'Aval
Festes-et-Saint-André
Gaja-et-Villedieu
Gardie
Greffeil
Ladern-sur-Lauquet
Limoux
Loupia
Magrie
Malras
Pauligne
Pieusse
Pomas
Saint-Couat-du-Razès
Saint-Hilaire
Saint-Martin-de-Villereglan
Saint-Polycarpe
Tourreilles
Véraza
Villar-Saint-Anselme
Villardebelle
Villebazy
Villelongue-d'Aude

References

Cantons of Aude